2 Sins is an American hip hop duo from Detroit, Michigan. They are known for their violent lyrics and most significant for their best-selling 1994 release, Look What Hell Created.

Biography
Members Low Life and Lethal were born and raised in Detroit, Michigan. They began making music together in early 1993. Their first album, entitled Look What Hell Created, was released in the summer of 1994. They would go on to record and produce over sixteen albums and EPs.

Discography

Albums and EPs

Singles

As featured performer

References

American hip hop groups
Musical groups from Detroit
Musical groups established in 1993
1993 establishments in Michigan